Gluviema is a monotypic genus of Galeodid camel spiders, first described by Ludovico di Caporiacco in 1937. Its single species, Gluviema migiurtina is distributed in Somalia.

References 

Solifugae
Arachnid genera
Monotypic arachnid genera